Bernard Zénier (born 21 August 1957) is a French former professional footballer.

Titles 
 Division 1 top goalscorer in 1986–87 with FC Metz
 Division 1 1984 with Girondins de Bordeaux
 Coupe de France 1988 with FC Metz

External links 

Profile

1957 births
Living people
Sportspeople from Meurthe-et-Moselle
French footballers
France international footballers
FC Metz players
AS Nancy Lorraine players
FC Girondins de Bordeaux players
Olympique de Marseille players
Ligue 1 players
Association football forwards
Footballers from Grand Est